The 1991 season was Molde's 17th season in the top flight of Norwegian football. This season Molde competed in Tippeligaen and the Norwegian Cup.

In Tippeligaen, Molde finished in 7th position, 14 points behind winners Viking. 

Molde participated in the 1991 Norwegian Cup. They reached the fourth round where they were knocked out by Fyllingen after losing 3–0 at away ground.

Squad
Source:

 (on loan from Norwich City)

Competitions

Tippeligaen

Results summary

Positions by round

Results

League table

Norwegian Cup

Squad statistics

Appearances and goals

 

 

 
 

   

 
|}

Goalscorers

See also
Molde FK seasons

References

External links
nifs.no

1991
Molde